Rzhevka is a rural locality (a selo) in Shebekinsky District, Belgorod Oblast, Russia. The population was 2,715 as of 2010. There are 21 streets.

Geography 
Rzhevka is located 10 km northeast of Shebekino (the district's administrative centre) by road. Nezhegol is the nearest rural locality.

References 

Rural localities in Shebekinsky District